Christian Auer (born 4 April 1966) is an Austrian skeleton racer who competed from the late 1980s to the 2002 Winter Olympics. He won five medals in the men's event at the FIBT World Championships with one gold (1991), two silvers (1989, 1995), and two bronzes (1992, 1996).

Auer also finished 12th in the men's skeleton at Salt Lake City in 2002.

He won the overall men's Skeleton World Cup title five times (1989–90, 1990-1, 1991-2, 1993-4, 1994-5).

Auer became a skeleton coach for the Canadian national team after the 2002 games.

References
2002 men's skeleton results
Austrian Olympic Committee profile 
List of men's skeleton World Cup champions since 1987.
Men's skeleton world championship medalists since 1989
Skeleton article featuring Auer

1966 births
Austrian male skeleton racers
Living people
Skeleton racers at the 2002 Winter Olympics
Olympic skeleton racers of Austria